The S & S Sandwich Shop (also known as the S&S Diner and the S & S Restaurant) is a historic site in Miami, Florida. It is located at 1757 Northeast 2nd Avenue. On January 4, 1989, it was added to the U.S. National Register of Historic Places.

The small-scale, Art Deco building was constructed in 1938 and includes a facade of pigmented structural glass and aluminum arranged in horizontal and vertical bands of beige, white, and red.

In 2017, the restaurant was evicted from the building, and the S & S Diner resumed at a nearby location.

References

External links

 Dade County listings at National Register of Historic Places
 Florida's Office of Cultural and Historical Programs
 Dade County listings
 S & S Restaurant and Deli

Buildings and structures in Miami
National Register of Historic Places in Miami
Restaurants in Miami
Restaurants on the National Register of Historic Places
1938 establishments in Florida
Restaurants established in 1938

es:Iglesia de San Juan el Bautista (Miami)